The Rolling Road is a 1927 British silent drama film directed by Graham Cutts and starring Carlyle Blackwell, Flora le Breton, Clifford Heatherley and A.V. Bramble. The screenplay concerns a young woman in a Cornish fishing village who has to choose between various suitors.

It was made at Islington Studios and on location at Porthleven in Cornwall and Great Yarmouth in Norfolk. It premiered in May 1927 and went on general release in September of the same year. Its critical reception was unenthusiastic, with reviewers feeling it was below the standard of Cutts' other work during the era.

Cast
 Carlyle Blackwell as Tom Forty
 Flora le Breton as Nell
 Clifford Heatherley as John Ogilvie
 A.V. Bramble as John Christobel
 Cameron Carr as Mate
 Marie Ault as Grannie
 Mickey Brantford as Nipper
 Benson Kleve as Captain

References

Bibliography

 Chapman, Gary. London's Hollywood: The Gainsborough Studio in the Silent Years. Edditt, 2014.
 Low, Rachel. The History of British Film: Volume IV, 1918–1929. Routledge, 1997.

External links

1927 films
1927 drama films
Films directed by Graham Cutts
British silent feature films
Films set in Cornwall
Films shot in Cornwall
Seafaring films
Gainsborough Pictures films
Islington Studios films
British drama films
British black-and-white films
1920s English-language films
1920s British films
Silent drama films
Silent adventure films